The Godolphin Arabian (–1753), also known as the Godolphin Barb, was an Arabian horse who was one of three stallions that founded the modern Thoroughbred (the others were the Darley Arabian and the Byerley Turk). He was named after his best-known owner, Francis Godolphin, 2nd Earl of Godolphin.

Origins

The Godolphin Arabian was foaled about 1724 in Yemen and moved several times before reaching England. At some early age, he was exported, probably via Syria, to the stud of the bey of Tunis. From there he was given to Louis XV of France in 1730. It is believed he was a present from monarch to monarch. Not valued by his new French owner, it is believed he was used as a carthorse.

The horse was then imported from France by Edward Coke and sent to his stud at Longford Hall, Derbyshire, where he remained until the death of his owner in 1733.

He was bequeathed to Roger Williams, "proprietor of the St. James's Coffee House", who inherited Coke's stallions. He was bought by the 2nd Earl of Godolphin, and placed at his stud at Babraham, Cambridgeshire, until his death on Christmas Day 1753. A stone marks his grave under the archway of the stable block of Wandlebury House.

Appearance

The Godolphin Arabian was a bay colour with some white on the off heel behind. Most of his immediate offspring were also bay.

The veterinary surgeon Osmer described the Godolphin Arabian in the following manner,

Breed controversy

Controversy exists over the ancestry of this horse; some writers referred to him as a Barb, but Judith Blunt-Lytton, 16th Baroness Wentworth of the Crabbet Arabian Stud concludes that it is most widely believed that he was an Arabian or had primarily Arabian lineage.

"Barb" is a reference to his believed country of origin, Tunisia, on the Barbary Coast.  Whyte in the 1840 History of the British Turf, refers to the horse as "The Godolphin Barb, or as he has been improperly called, the Godolphin Arabian" (emphasis added) before further clarifying, "he was long considered an Arabian, although his points resembled more those of the highest breed of Barbs." However, portraits showing a horse with a high-carried tail and dished profile, features that differentiate the two types, lead modern experts to believe he was more likely an Arabian. The confusion is understandable, but while the breeds have some characteristics in common and are distantly related, their phenotypes are quite distinct. There was also an argument raised that he was actually a Turkomen, merely called an Arabian in order to raise the stud fee.

The Earl of Godolphin referred to the horse as an Arabian, and he was described as such by the painter George Stubbs. Lord Godolphin later bought a second stallion in 1750. This one he clearly called a "barb". Both were of a similar bay colour, but the Barb had a star. Godolphin later bought a grey Barb, which has also caused some confusion over the years.

Recent DNA studies disprove the theory that he was a Barb, as his descendants' Y-DNA traces to the same general haplotype as the Darley Arabian, though to different sub-groups and there are relatively few male-line descendants of the Godolphin Arabian today.   This group may have been of Turkoman horse or Arabian origins, as modern horses of both breeds have been linked to this haplotype.

Breeding career

The Godolphin Arabian was the leading sire in Great Britain and Ireland in 1738, 1745 and 1747.

Originally, this small stallion was considered inferior to the larger European horses of the time and was not meant to be put to stud. Instead he was used as 'teaser', a stallion used to gauge the mare's receptiveness. This changed when Lady Roxana, a mare brought to the stud specifically to be bred to a stallion called Hobgoblin, rejected her intended mate, and so the Godolphin Arabian was allowed to cover her instead.

The result of this mating was Lath, the first of his offspring, who went on to win the Queen's Plate nine times out of nine at the Newmarket races. The second colt from this pair was Cade, and the third was Regulus. All three were the same gold-touched bay as their sire, with the same small build and high-crested conformation. All were exceptionally fast on the track, and went on to sire many foals themselves. This was the start of the Godolphin Arabian's prowess as a racing stud, and he spent the rest of his days as the Earl of Godolphin's prize stallion, bred to England's finest mares.

The American connection began with the filly Selima (born in 1745 out of Shireborn). She was purchased by Benjamin Tasker Jr. of the Province of Maryland in Colonial America, carried to the new world, and raced between 1750 and 1753. She won the biggest prize of the era, 2,500 pistoles at Gloucester, Virginia which marked "the beginning of the remarkable racing contests between the rival colonies of Maryland and Virginia." After this, she became a successful broodmare at the Belair Stud in Collington, Maryland.

The Godolphin Arabian died on the Gog Magog Hills, Cambridgeshire in 1753, aged around 29.  The horse's grave in the stable block of Wandlebury House can be visited.  When he was interred, the occasion was marked with ale and cake.

Legacy
Although today the majority of Thoroughbred horses’ sire lines trace to the Darley Arabian, several famous North American horses of the past trace their sire line back to the Godolphin Arabian. These include Seabiscuit, Man o' War, and War Admiral. Today, the sire line is primarily supported by descendants of Relaunch and his son Cee's Tizzy through dual Breeders' Cup Classic winner Tiznow.

In Europe, his influence survives mainly through the 2,000 Guineas winner Known Fact, and his son, the champion miler Warning. This line has produced outstanding sprinters such as Diktat (Haydock Sprint Cup), Avonbridge and Dream Ahead.  The Derby has not been won by a sire line descendant of the Godolphin Arabian since Santa Claus in 1964 and is nowadays dominated by descendants of the Darley Arabian.

The major Thoroughbred sire Eclipse traces in his sire line to the Darley Arabian, but his dam was a daughter of Regulus and thus also traces to the Godolphin Arabian.  This pattern continues to be seen today, with the Godolphin Arabian more heavily represented in dam lines and in the "middle" of pedigrees (as opposed to direct sire lines).

In fiction
King of the Wind (Chicago: Rand McNally, 1948) is a fictional biography of the Godolphin Arabian by American author Marguerite Henry. She wrote many books about horses for children, and perhaps is best known for Misty of Chincoteague and its sequels. She won the Newbery Medal for King of the Wind, recognizing it as the year's "most distinguished contribution to American literature for children". Misty became a film in 1961, but King of the Wind had to wait till 1990 for its adaptation, with Navin Chowdhry as the Arabian's lifetime stable boy Agba.

In the novel, the Godolphin Arabian was foaled in Morocco and was called Sham. He came to Europe as a diplomatic gift to King Louis XV of France but, due to his poor condition on arrival and relatively small size, was given to the cook as a cart horse. He was soon sold to a woodcarter in Paris, where he was treated poorly and then purchased by the Quaker Edward Coke of Holkham Hall, older brother of the 1st Earl of Leicester 5th Creation, then sold to Francis, Earl of Godolphin, who maintained a stud in Suffolk, near the racing town of Newmarket.

Sire line tree

Godolphin Arabian
Lath
Red Cap
Hector
Dismal
Maggot
Titter-up Call
Cade
Bandy
Changeling
Le Sang
Bourbon
Orpheus
Favourite
Miracle
Lightfoot
Lightning
Jack the Batchelor
Scampston Cade
Young Davy
Slouch
Trunnian
Victim
Young Cade
Celadine
Dove
Liberty
Julius Caesar
Takamahaka
Tanner
Bajazet
Belmont
Carnatic
Ajax
Dunce
Royal George
Drone
Daniel
Aethon
Cadmus
Carbineer
Tot
Holyhock
Valentine
Bold
Comet
Martin
Matchem
Dictator
Espersykes
Ranthose
Turf
Crop
Conductor
Imperator
Trumpator
Pantaloon
Tipoo
Merry Andrew
Grey Pantaloon
Buffer
Harry Rowe
John Doe
Johnny
Pumpkin
Young Pumpkin
Tumbler
Archer
Nimrod
Grey Pumpkin
Alfred
Elfleda
Ransom
Brown Bessy
Doctor
Guyler
Shipton
Gaudy
Protector
Magnum Bonum
Trimmer
Merryman
Villager
Cademus
Cadormus
Gift
Hero
Friar
Father O'Leary
Adonis
Sportsman
Consul
Turpin
Wildair
Wildair (Simm)
Bashaw
Telemachus
May Flower
Tommy
Belford
Cadee
Northumberland
Montezuma
Ragamuffin
Teucer
Young Northumberland
Silvio
Dapper
Laurel
Pangloss
Young Trunnian
Silvio (Brother)
Swift
Boreas
Dumplin
Cadabora
Cadet
Fellow
Twig
Mogul
Jolly Roger
Lonsdale
Spanking Roger
Darius
Jolly Roger (Ruffin)
Young Mogul
Mark
Whistlejacket
Coriolanus
Ramjam
Roscius
Marlborough
Babraham
Aimwell
Babraham (Lowther)
Hob-Or-Nob
Newcastle Jack
Atlas
Juba
Juniper
Alcides
Gander
Remnant
Constantine
Councillor
Genius
Morpheus
Babraham (Nelson)
Bosphorus
Warwickshire Wag
Badger
Matchem
Americus
Babraham (Wildman)
Slim
Union
Babraham Blank
Bay Richmond
Cincinnatus
Carbuncle
Shadow
Black Prince
Cardinal Puff
Cardinal Puff
Colossus
Young Babraham
Dormouse
Dainty
Dormouse (Walgrave)
Damon
Valiant
Greybeard
Dorimond
Paoli
Janus
Janus (American Quarter Horse)
Babram
Peacock
Spadille
Sporting Toby
Babraham (Goode)
Bacchus
Mercury
Quicksilver
Buie
Brutus
Camden
Bandy Ball
Warning
One Eye
Scott
Silver Heels
Sterne
Celer
Garrick
Celer
Dreadnought
Milo
Telemachus (Johnson)
Telemachus (Wood)
Little Janus
Sansculottes
McKinney's Roan
Decius
Clodius
Twig (Goode)
Twig (Anderson)
Sprightly
Pilgarlick
Coomb
Regulus
Juba
Regulus (Blake)
Brutus
Cato
Singlepeeper
Trajan
Royal
Adolphus
Navigator
Negotiator
Strawberry
Attilius
Aurelianus
Redstreak
Silvereye
South
Confederate
Friar
South West
South East
Magog
Cormorant
Amazon
Laycock
Flimnap
Flimnap (Hayne)
Paragon
Polydore
Bumper
Careless
Regulator
Mousetrap
Cassius
Huntsman
Alderman
Rocket
Dionysius
Forester
Jolly Roger
Justice
Shorthose
Prince Ferdinand
Liberty
Archer
Apollo
Jolly Bacchus
Bacchus
Fearnaught
Matchless
Whynot
Regulus (Fitzhugh)
Chatham
True Whig
Patriot
King Herod
Fearnought (Dandridge)
Pegasus
Achmet
Godolphin (Baylor)
Diamond
Eclipse
Brimmer
Asahel
Shakespeare (Thornton)
Union
Goldfinder
Flag of Truce
Shakespeare (Baylor)
Independence
Specimen
Aeolus
Paul Jones
Pilgrim
Fox
Grey John
Handel
Wildair (Symme)
Highflier
Pegasus
Commutation
Debonaire
Wildair (Thornton)
Chanticleer
American Eagle
Lexington
Fearnought (Macklin)
Dragon
Junius
St. George
Elephant
Sultan
Vampire
Jalap
Achilles
Florio
Picture
Regulus (Burwell)
Ascham
Broomstick
Chesnut Ranger
Foxhunter
Ranger
Merry Tom
Star
Regulus Colt
Master Stephen
Prophet
Standby
Ranger
Doge
Cashkeeper
Venetian
Maryland Phoenix
Eclipse
Young Sir Peter
Morwick Ball
Icelander
Young Morwick
Cavendish
Gustavus
Tom Tring
Little David
Regulus
Curanto
Trimbush
Myrtle
Parlington
Doctor Nim
No-no
Pellegrine
All-Fours
All-Fours
Turk
Bucephalus
Denmark
Sejanus
Oberon
Bajazet
Bajazet
Louth
Prince Ferdinand
Mahomet
Selim
Blank
Contest
Tatler
Young Blank
Horatius
Manby
Spot
Antinous
Darling
Lamplighter
Givens
Centinel
Centinel (Wilkin)
Rocket
Surley
Tripod
Blank
Fallower
Justice
Granby
Knavestock
Prig
Brittanicus
Whipster
Bully
Chatsworth
Chrysolite
Eugenius
Amethyst
Laurel
Tycho
Pacolet
Pacolet
Citizen
Dapple
Blank
Peacock
Pacolet (Jackson)
Baber
North Star
King's Son of Blank
Hyder Ally
Paymaster
Bellona
Mars
Selavelin
Young Paymaster
Paragon
Paymaster
Lycurgus
Paoli
Ancaster
Monarch
Gower Stallion
Little David
Sweepstakes
Trentham
Driver
Cob Web
Grey Trentham
Staghunter
Foxhunter
Invalid
David
Spectre
Mealey Eyes
Priam
Grey Gower
Jolly Roger
Whittington
Marksman
Old England
Brutus
Northumberland
Hopeful
Amaranthus
Skewball
Sultan
Statesman
Young Statesman
Buffcoat
Whitefoot
Buffcoat
Mustard
Creampot
Turf
Whitenose
Aaron
Victorious
Wasp
Keddlestone
Ladylegs
Pegasus
Rake
Starling
Young Dormouse
Noble
Dimple
Ranter
Tarquin
Tarquin
Alfred
Chub
Bolton
Infant
Spot
Godolphin Hunter
Bay Robin
Blossum
Young Blossum
Chalfont
Sparrow
Redivivus
Creeper
Merry Traveler
Woodbine
Mignionette
Tonnere
Coalition Colt
Careless
Entrance
Young Champion
Mirza
Miaburn
Alchymist
Cripple
Gimcrack
Grey Robin
Medley
Dallas
Medley Colt
Gimcrack (Randolph)
Bellair 2nd
Grey Diomed
Lamplighter
Grey Dungannon
Quicksilver
Boxer
Grey Medley
Hannibal
Melzar
Alfred
Tantrum
Sampson
Nottingham
Augustus
Aethon
Bragg
Cygnet
Gog
Fearnought
Feather
Bay Richmond
Bunten
Weasel
Lofty
Slim
Lash
Frolick
Goldolphin Colt
Marquis
Matchless
Ragman
Omar
Nobody
Blemish
Posthumus
Fabius
Captain Bobadil
Sprightly
Pyrrhus
Edgar
Sisyfus

See also

Foundation bloodstock
List of historical horses

References

Citations

External links
Lemay, A. & Rogers, J. (2000). The Burial Place of the Godolphin Arabian.  Retrieved 2012-12-15

Arabian, Godolphin
1724 racehorse births
1753 racehorse deaths
Individual Arabian and part-Arabian horses
 
Animals as diplomatic gifts
Foundation horse sires